A Buddy Burner is a simple stove made from a can and part of a corrugated paper box. It is usually fueled by paraffin wax but other fuels, such as boiled butter, animal fat or diesel fuel, can be used.
It is usually used for cooking but can also provide heat.

The most common type of buddy burner is made from a tuna or cat food can because of the low profile. The corrugated paper is cut into a strip as wide as the can is tall then rolled into a tight coil and placed in the can. The can is then filled with fuel (if fueled with paraffin wax it is first melted) leaving enough of the paper above the fuel to act as a wick. Using paraffin wax as a fuel has two advantages. First, when the burner cools the wax hardens making it convenient to keep in the burner for later use. Second, it is safe to refuel the burner while it is operating since placing solid paraffin wax on top of the burning stove involves no danger of the fresh fuel igniting explosively.

Since oxygen is necessary for combustion, holes may need to be punched around the top of the can to allow air to enter, and to provide a way for combustion gases to escape around the pot.

Safety precautions
Modern canning techniques now employ coatings that may produce toxic fumes when burning and can cause metal fume fever, and care must therefore be taken to ensure that cans used for burning are uncoated plain metal. Such coatings are usually used for tomatoes and other acidic foods.

Candles are usually made of paraffin wax and can be melted to put into a Buddy Burner. However, candles or paraffin wax blocks should be melted in a double boiler so that they cannot catch fire.

See also
 Beverage-can stove
 Portable stove
 Biomass cook stove
 Hobo stove
 Bunsen burner

References

External links
 https://m.youtube.com/watch?v=PIGYmINc5yc&feature=youtu.be

Camping equipment